Juliana Luise von Ostfriesland (1698-1740), was a Princess of Ostfriesland by birth, and by marriage Duchess of Schleswig-Holstein-Sonderburg-Plön.

A daughter of Christian Everhard, Prince of East Frisia, she was chosen by her cousin Charlotte Christine of Brunswick-Lüneburg to be her Ober-Hofmeisterin at the Russian court. A favorite and confidant of Charlotte Christine, she was accused of isolating her from Russia, prevented her from adjusting to her new life and creating distance between her and her spouse, the Russian heir to the throne.

References 
 Данилова А. Кронпринцесса Шарлотта, невестка Петра Великого // Русские императоры, немецкие принцессы. Династические связи, человеческие судьбы. — М: Изографус, ЭКСМО-Пресс, 2002. — С. 42. — 320 с. — 8000 экз. — .

1698 births
1740 deaths
Ladies-in-waiting from the Russian Empire